Beau Van Burrows (born September 18, 1996) is an American professional baseball pitcher in the Atlanta Braves organization. He has played in Major League Baseball (MLB) for the Detroit Tigers and Minnesota Twins.

Amateur career
Burrows attended Weatherford High School in Weatherford, Texas. In 2015, as a senior, he had a 9–3 win–loss record with a 0.89 earned run average (ERA), striking out 132 in 71 innings pitched.

Professional career

Detroit Tigers
The Detroit Tigers selected Burrows in the first round, with the 22nd overall selection, of the 2015 MLB draft. He signed with the Tigers, forgoing his commitment to play college baseball at Texas A&M University.

Burrows made his professional debut in 2015 with the GCL Tigers and spent the whole season there, posting a 1–0 record with a 1.61 ERA in ten games (nine starts). After his success in the Gulf Coast League, Burrows was promoted to the West Michigan Whitecaps for the 2016 season. He spent the whole season there and posted a 6–4 record with a 3.15 ERA in 21 games (20 being starts). In 2017, Burrows spent time with both the Lakeland Flying Tigers and the Erie SeaWolves, posting a combined 10–7 record and 3.20 ERA in 26 combined starts between both teams. He spent 2018 with Erie, pitching to a 10–9 record with a 4.10 ERA in 26 starts.

Burrows began 2019 with the Toledo Mud Hens. Burrows struggled with injuries over the course of the 2019 season and would ultimately start just 15 games in Toledo. He finished with a 2–6 record and 5.51 ERA in Toledo.

Burrows was added to the Tigers 40-man roster following the 2019 season. Burrows made his major league debut on July 27, 2020, but allowed two home runs and three earned runs over  innings. With the 2020 Detroit Tigers, Burrows appeared in five games, compiling a 0–0 record with 5.40 ERA and three strikeouts in  innings pitched.

Burrows made his 2021 debut with the Tigers in June before being pulled from the game after becoming ill in the hot afternoon sun and vomiting on the mound. After the game, the Tigers optioned Burrows back to Toledo. Burrows was designated for assignment by Detroit on June 15, 2021.

Minnesota Twins
On June 22, 2021, the Minnesota Twins claimed Burrows off waivers and assigned him to the Triple-A St. Paul Saints. On July 17, Burrows was recalled to the active roster by Minnesota. On August 19, the Twins sent Burrows outright to Triple-A St. Paul.

Los Angeles Dodgers
On November 23, 2021, Burrows signed a minor league contract with the Los Angeles Dodgers. He spent the season with the Triple-A Oklahoma City Dodgers, pitching in 31 games (16 starts) with an 8–6 record and 7.18 ERA. Burrows elected to become a free agent on October 22.

Atlanta Braves
On February 23, 2023, Burrows signed a minor league contract with the Atlanta Braves.

References

External links

1996 births
Living people
Baseball players from Fort Worth, Texas
Detroit Tigers players
Erie SeaWolves players
Gulf Coast Tigers players
Lakeland Flying Tigers players
Major League Baseball pitchers
Minnesota Twins players
St. Paul Saints players
Toledo Mud Hens players
West Michigan Whitecaps players
Oklahoma City Dodgers players